Penrhos is an area or hamlet at the top of the hill east of Kington, Herefordshire near the Welsh border. The name is derived from the Welsh words pen and rhos and means "head (top) of the moor". In the area there are a small number of buildings including Penrhos Farm and Penrhos Court.

History
Penrhos Court originated around the late 13th century with a large cruck dwelling. Generations of owners have added more buildings and at one stage it became a small hamlet of half a dozen dwellings. Farm barns were added which formed a squared of ancient farm building surrounding a courtyard with a puddle duck pond and a well in the middle.

Many famous people have stayed at Penrhos Court including Queen, Led Zeppelin, Mike Oldfield and Terry Jones of Monty Python.

Queen stayed there for a couple of weeks in August 1975 to rehearse their album A Night at the Opera (which features the hit "You're My Best Friend" and the legendary "Bohemian Rhapsody") before embarking to Rockfield Studios in Monmouth.

References

External links

Villages in Herefordshire